Leadenham House is a Grade II* listed Georgian country house in Leadenham, Lincolnshire, England.

The house is constructed in '2½ storeys' of ashlar and dressed limestone rubble with ashlar dressings and a slate hipped roof with a 7 bay frontage to the west. North and South faces, of 4 bays, are identical.   

The House stands in parkland surrounded by 3,000 acres of farmland. The gateway of similar Ashlar construction is also a listed building.

History
The hall was built for William Reeve between 1790 and 1796 by Christopher Staveley of Melton Mowbray. It was extended by architect Lewis Vulliamy in 1826–29 and altered by architect Detmar Blow in 1903. Blow also hung two of the reception rooms with hand-painted oriental wallpapers. 

It descended in the Reeve family to Lt-Col William Reeve (1906–1993) who was High Sheriff of Lincolnshire for 1957. Following the 2013 divorce of Peter Reeve and his former wife Henrietta, the estate's value was divided between the ex-spouses. This was disputed unsuccessfully by their elder son William who wished to keep the estate intact.

References

External links
The polo club

Country houses in Lincolnshire
Grade II* listed buildings in Lincolnshire
Grade II* listed houses
North Kesteven District
Georgian architecture in England